The 1898 Stepney by-election was held on 9 March 1898 following the death of the incumbent Conservative MP, Frederick Wootton Isaacson on 22 February 1898.

Candidates
The Conservative Party candidate was William Evans-Gordon, a career diplomat in the British Raj who had retired as a political officer in 1897.

The Liberal Party candidate was W. C. Steadman. Steadman was the London County Council member for Stepney and had unsuccessfully fought Hammersmith in the 1895 general election.

Both candidates had fought Stepney at the London County Council election on 3 March 1898.

Result

References

Stepney by-election
Stepney,1898 
1898 in England
1898 in London
Stepney,1898